Phoneyusa rutilata, or the West African gray baboon spider, is a member of the tarantula family, Theraphosidae, native to Guinea-Bissau.

Description
Phoneyusa rutilata is a burrowing spider. It is blackish in color with a thick tawny-red covering of hairs.

Distribution
Phoneyusa rutilata is native to Guinea-Bissau. It was originally described from Bolama Island.

References

Theraphosidae
Spiders of Africa
Spiders described in 1907